The Central African Republic (CAR;  ; , RCA; , or) is a landlocked country in Central Africa. It is bordered by Chad to the north, Sudan to the northeast, South Sudan to the southeast, the Democratic Republic of the Congo to the south, the Republic of the Congo to the southwest, and Cameroon to the west.

, it had an estimated population of around  million. , the Central African Republic is the scene of a civil war, which is ongoing since 2012.

Most of the Central African Republic consists of Sudano-Guinean savannas, but the country also includes a Sahelo-Sudanian zone in the north and an equatorial forest zone in the south. Two-thirds of the country is within the Ubangi River basin (which flows into the Congo), while the remaining third lies in the basin of the Chari, which flows into Lake Chad.

What is today the Central African Republic has been inhabited for at least since 8,000 BCE. The country's borders were established by France, which ruled the country as a colony starting in the late 19th century. After gaining independence from France in 1960, the Central African Republic was ruled by a series of autocratic leaders, including an abortive attempt at a monarchy.

By the 1990s, calls for democracy led to the first multi-party democratic elections in 1993. Ange-Félix Patassé became president, but was later removed by General François Bozizé in the 2003 coup. The Central African Republic Bush War began in 2004 and, despite a peace treaty in 2007 and another in 2011, civil war resumed in 2012. The civil war perpetuated the country's poor human rights record: it was characterized by widespread and increasing abuses by various participating armed groups, such as arbitrary imprisonment, torture, and restrictions on freedom of the press and freedom of movement.

Despite (or arguably because of) its significant mineral deposits and other resources, such as uranium reserves, crude oil, gold, diamonds, cobalt, lumber, and hydropower, as well as significant quantities of arable land, the Central African Republic is among the ten poorest countries in the world, with the lowest GDP per capita at purchasing power parity in the world as of 2017. , according to the Human Development Index (HDI), the country had the fourth-lowest level of human development, ranking 188 out of 191 countries. The country had the lowest inequality-adjusted Human Development Index (IHDI), ranking 156th out of 156 countries. The Central African Republic is also estimated to be the unhealthiest country as well as the worst country in which to be young.

The Central African Republic is a member of the United Nations, the African Union, the Economic Community of Central African States, the Organisation internationale de la Francophonie and the Non-Aligned Movement.

Etymology 
The name of the Central African Republic is derived from the country's geographical location in the central region of Africa and its republican form of government. From 1976 to 1979, the country was known as the Central African Empire.

During the colonial era, the country's name was Ubangi-Shari, a name derived from the Ubangi River and the Chari River. Barthélemy Boganda, the country's first prime minister, favored the name "Central African Republic" over Ubangi-Shari, reportedly because he envisioned a larger union of countries in Central Africa.

History

Early history 
Approximately 10,000 years ago, desertification forced hunter-gatherer societies south into the Sahel regions of northern Central Africa, where some groups settled. Farming began as part of the Neolithic Revolution. Initial farming of white yam progressed into millet and sorghum, and before 3000 BCE the domestication of African oil palm improved the groups' nutrition and allowed for expansion of the local populations. This Agricultural Revolution, combined with a "Fish-stew Revolution", in which fishing began to take place, and the use of boats, allowed for the transportation of goods. Products were often moved in ceramic pots, which are the first known examples of artistic expression from the region's inhabitants.

The Bouar Megaliths in the western region of the country indicate an advanced level of habitation dating back to the very late Neolithic Era (c. 3500–2700 BCE). Ironworking developed in the region around 1000 BCE.

The Ubangian people settled along the Ubangi River in what is today Central and East Central African Republic while some Bantu peoples migrated from the southwest from Cameroon.

Bananas arrived in the region during the first millennium BCE and added an important source of carbohydrates to the diet; they were also used in the production of alcoholic beverages. Production of copper, salt, dried fish, and textiles dominated the economic trade in the Central African region.

16th–19th century

In the 16th and 17th centuries slave traders began to raid the region as part of the expansion of the Saharan and Nile River slave routes. Their captives were enslaved and shipped to the Mediterranean coast, Europe, Arabia, the Western Hemisphere, or to the slave ports and factories along the West and North Africa or South along the Ubanqui and Congo rivers. In the mid 19th century, the Bobangi people became major slave traders and sold their captives to the Americas using the Ubangi river to reach the coast. During the 18th century Bandia-Nzakara Azande peoples established the Bangassou Kingdom along the Ubangi River. In 1875, the Sudanese sultan Rabih az-Zubayr governed Upper-Oubangui, which included present-day Central African Republic.

French colonial period 

The European invasion of Central African territory began in the late 19th century during the Scramble for Africa. Europeans, primarily the French, Germans, and Belgians, arrived in the area in 1885. France seized and colonized Ubangi-Shari territory in 1894. In 1911 at the Treaty of Fez, France ceded a nearly 300,000 km2 portion of the Sangha and Lobaye basins to the German Empire which ceded a smaller area (in present-day Chad) to France. After World War I France again annexed the territory. Modeled on King Leopold's Congo Free State, concessions were doled out to private companies that endeavored to strip the region's assets as quickly and cheaply as possible before depositing a percentage of their profits into the French treasury. The concessionary companies forced local people to harvest rubber, coffee, and other commodities without pay and held their families hostage until they met their quotas.

In 1920 French Equatorial Africa was established and Ubangi-Shari was administered from Brazzaville. During the 1920s and 1930s the French introduced a policy of mandatory cotton cultivation, a network of roads was built, attempts were made to combat sleeping sickness, and Protestant missions were established to spread Christianity. New forms of forced labor were also introduced and a large number of Ubangians were sent to work on the Congo-Ocean Railway. Through the period of construction until 1934 there was a continual heavy cost in human lives, with total deaths among all workers along the railway estimated in excess of 17,000 of the construction workers, from a combination of both industrial accidents and diseases including malaria. In 1928, a major insurrection, the Kongo-Wara rebellion or 'war of the hoe handle', broke out in Western Ubangi-Shari and continued for several years. The extent of this insurrection, which was perhaps the largest anti-colonial rebellion in Africa during the interwar years, was carefully hidden from the French public because it provided evidence of strong opposition to French colonial rule and forced labor.

In September 1940, during the Second World War, pro-Gaullist French officers took control of Ubangi-Shari and General Leclerc established his headquarters for the Free French Forces in Bangui. In 1946 Barthélemy Boganda was elected with 9,000 votes to the French National Assembly, becoming the first representative of the Central African Republic in the French government. Boganda maintained a political stance against racism and the colonial regime but gradually became disheartened with the French political system and returned to the Central African Republic to establish the Movement for the Social Evolution of Black Africa (Mouvement pour l'évolution sociale de l'Afrique noire, MESAN) in 1950.

Since independence (1960–present) 
In the Ubangi-Shari Territorial Assembly election in 1957, MESAN captured 347,000 out of the total 356,000 votes and won every legislative seat, which led to Boganda being elected president of the Grand Council of French Equatorial Africa and vice-president of the Ubangi-Shari Government Council. Within a year, he declared the establishment of the Central African Republic and served as the country's first prime minister. MESAN continued to exist, but its role was limited. The Central Africa Republic was granted autonomy within the French Community on 1 December 1958, a status which meant it was still counted as part of the French Empire in Africa.

After Boganda's death in a plane crash on 29 March 1959, his cousin, David Dacko, took control of MESAN. Dacko became the country's first president when the Central African Republic formally received independence from France at midnight on 13 August 1960, a date celebrated by the country's Independence Day holiday. Dacko threw out his political rivals, including Abel Goumba, former Prime Minister and leader of Mouvement d'évolution démocratique de l'Afrique centrale (MEDAC), whom he forced into exile in France. With all opposition parties suppressed by November 1962, Dacko declared MESAN as the official party of the state.

Bokassa and the Central African Empire (1965–1979)

On 31 December 1965, Dacko was overthrown in the Saint-Sylvestre coup d'état by Colonel Jean-Bédel Bokassa, who suspended the constitution and dissolved the National Assembly. President Bokassa declared himself President for Life in 1972 and named himself Emperor Bokassa I of the Central African Empire (as the country was renamed) on 4 December 1976. A year later, Emperor Bokassa crowned himself in a lavish and expensive ceremony that was ridiculed by much of the world.

In April 1979, young students protested against Bokassa's decree that all school pupils were required to buy uniforms from a company owned by one of his wives. The government violently suppressed the protests, killing 100 children and teenagers. Bokassa might have been personally involved in some of the killings. In September 1979, France overthrew Bokassa and restored Dacko to power (subsequently restoring the official name of the country and the original government to the Central African Republic). Dacko, in turn, was again overthrown in a coup by General André Kolingba on 1 September 1981.

Central African Republic under Kolingba 
Kolingba suspended the constitution and ruled with a military junta until 1985. He introduced a new constitution in 1986 which was adopted by a nationwide referendum. Membership in his new party, the Rassemblement Démocratique Centrafricain (RDC), was voluntary. In 1987 and 1988, semi-free elections to parliament were held, but Kolingba's two major political opponents, Abel Goumba and Ange-Félix Patassé, were not allowed to participate.

By 1990, inspired by the fall of the Berlin Wall, a pro-democracy movement arose. Pressure from the United States, France, and from a group of locally represented countries and agencies called GIBAFOR (France, the US, Germany, Japan, the EU, the World Bank, and the UN) finally led Kolingba to agree, in principle, to hold free elections in October 1992 with help from the UN Office of Electoral Affairs. After using the excuse of alleged irregularities to suspend the results of the elections as a pretext for holding on to power, President Kolingba came under intense pressure from GIBAFOR to establish a "Conseil National Politique Provisoire de la République" (Provisional National Political Council, CNPPR) and to set up a "Mixed Electoral Commission", which included representatives from all political parties.

When a second round of elections were finally held in 1993, again with the help of the international community coordinated by GIBAFOR, Ange-Félix Patassé won in the second round of voting with 53% of the vote while Goumba won 45.6%. Patassé's party, the Mouvement pour la Libération du Peuple Centrafricain (MLPC) or Movement for the Liberation of the Central African People, gained a plurality (relative majority) but not an absolute majority of seats in parliament, which meant Patassé's party required coalition partners.

Patassé government (1993–2003) 
Patassé purged many of the Kolingba elements from the government and Kolingba supporters accused Patassé's government of conducting a "witch hunt" against the Yakoma. A new constitution was approved on 28 December 1994 but had little impact on the country's politics. In 1996–1997, reflecting steadily decreasing public confidence in the government's erratic behavior, three mutinies against Patassé's administration were accompanied by widespread destruction of property and heightened ethnic tension. During this time (1996), the Peace Corps evacuated all its volunteers to neighboring Cameroon. To date, the Peace Corps has not returned to the Central African Republic. The Bangui Agreements, signed in January 1997, provided for the deployment of an inter-African military mission, to the Central African Republic and re-entry of ex-mutineers into the government on 7 April 1997. The inter-African military mission was later replaced by a U.N. peacekeeping force (MINURCA). Since 1997, the country has hosted almost a dozen peacekeeping interventions, earning it the title of "world champion of peacekeeping".

In 1998, parliamentary elections resulted in Kolingba's RDC winning 20 out of 109 seats. The next year, however, in spite of widespread public anger in urban centers over his corrupt rule, Patassé won a second term in the presidential election.

On 28 May 2001, rebels stormed strategic buildings in Bangui in an unsuccessful coup attempt. The army chief of staff, Abel Abrou, and General François N'Djadder Bedaya were killed, but Patassé regained the upper hand by bringing in at least 300 troops of the Congolese rebel leader Jean-Pierre Bemba and Libyan soldiers.

In the aftermath of the failed coup, militias loyal to Patassé sought revenge against rebels in many neighborhoods of Bangui and incited unrest including the murder of many political opponents. Eventually, Patassé came to suspect that General François Bozizé was involved in another coup attempt against him, which led Bozizé to flee with loyal troops to Chad. In March 2003, Bozizé launched a surprise attack against Patassé, who was out of the country. Libyan troops and some 1,000 soldiers of Bemba's Congolese rebel organization failed to stop the rebels and Bozizé's forces succeeded in overthrowing Patassé.

Civil wars 

François Bozizé suspended the constitution and named a new cabinet, which included most opposition parties. Abel Goumba was named vice-president, which gave Bozizé's new government a positive image. Bozizé established a broad-based National Transition Council to draft a new constitution, and announced that he would step down and run for office once the new constitution was approved.

In 2004, the Central African Republic Bush War began, as forces opposed to Bozizé took up arms against his government. In May 2005, Bozizé won the presidential election, which excluded Patassé, and in 2006 fighting continued between the government and the rebels. In November 2006, Bozizé's government requested French military support to help them repel rebels who had taken control of towns in the country's northern regions.
Though the initial public details of the agreement pertained to logistics and intelligence, by December the French assistance included airstrikes by Dassault Mirage 2000 fighters against rebel positions.

The Syrte Agreement in February and the Birao Peace Agreement in April 2007 called for a cessation of hostilities, the billeting of FDPC fighters and their integration with FACA, the liberation of political prisoners, integration of FDPC into government, an amnesty for the UFDR, its recognition as a political party, and the integration of its fighters into the national army. Several groups continued to fight but other groups signed on to the agreement, or similar agreements with the government (e.g. UFR on 15 December 2008). The only major group not to sign an agreement at the time was the CPJP, which continued its activities and signed a peace agreement with the government on 25 August 2012.

In 2011, Bozizé was reelected in an election which was widely considered fraudulent.

In November 2012, Séléka, a coalition of rebel groups, took over towns in the northern and central regions of the country. These groups eventually reached a peace deal with the Bozizé's government in January 2013 involving a power sharing government but this deal broke down and the rebels seized the capital in March 2013 and Bozizé fled the country.

Michel Djotodia took over as president. Prime Minister Nicolas Tiangaye requested a UN peacekeeping force from the UN Security Council and on 31 May former President Bozizé was indicted for crimes against humanity and incitement of genocide.
By the end of the year there were international warnings of a "genocide" and fighting was largely from reprisal attacks on civilians from Seleka's predominantly Muslim fighters and Christian militias called "anti-balaka." By August 2013, there were reports of over 200,000 internally displaced persons (IDPs)

French President François Hollande called on the UN Security Council and African Union to increase their efforts to stabilize the country. On 18 February 2014, United Nations Secretary-General Ban Ki-moon called on the UN Security Council to immediately deploy 3,000 troops to the country, bolstering the 6,000 African Union soldiers and 2,000 French troops already in the country, to combat civilians being murdered in large numbers. The Séléka government was said to be divided, and in September 2013, Djotodia officially disbanded Seleka, but many rebels refused to disarm, becoming known as ex-Seleka, and veered further out of government control. It is argued that the focus of the initial disarmament efforts exclusively on the Seleka inadvertently handed the anti-Balaka the upper hand, leading to the forced displacement of Muslim civilians by anti-Balaka in Bangui and western Central African Republic.

On 11 January 2014, Michael Djotodia and Nicolas Tiengaye resigned as part of a deal negotiated at a regional summit in neighboring Chad. Catherine Samba-Panza was elected as interim president by the National Transitional Council, becoming the first ever female Central African president. On 23 July 2014, following Congolese mediation efforts, Séléka and anti-balaka representatives signed a ceasefire agreement in Brazzaville. By the end of 2014, the country was de facto partitioned with the anti-Balaka in the southwest and ex-Seleka in the northeast. In March 2015, Samantha Power, the U.S. ambassador to the United Nations, said 417 of the country's 436 mosques had been destroyed, and Muslim women were so scared of going out in public they were giving birth in their homes instead of going to the hospital. On 14 December 2015, Séléka rebel leaders declared an independent Republic of Logone.

Touadéra government (2016–) 
Presidential elections were held in December 2015. As no candidate received more than 50% of the vote, a second round of elections was held on 14 February 2016 with run-offs on 31 March 2016. In the second round of voting, former Prime Minister Faustin-Archange Touadéra was declared the winner with 63% of the vote, defeating Union for Central African Renewal candidate Anicet-Georges Dologuélé, another former Prime Minister. While the elections suffered from many potential voters being absent as they had taken refuge in other countries, the fears of widespread violence were ultimately unfounded and the African Union regarded the elections as successful.

Touadéra was sworn in on 30 March 2016. No representatives of the Seleka rebel group or the "anti-balaka" militias were included in the subsequently formed government.

After the end of Touadéra's first term, presidential elections were held on 27 December 2020 with a possible second round planned for 14 February 2021. Former president François Bozizé announced his candidacy on 25 July 2020 but was rejected by the Constitutional Court of the country, which held that Bozizé did not satisfy the "good morality" requirement for candidates because of an international warrant and United Nations sanctions against him for alleged assassinations, torture and other crimes.

As large parts of the country were at the time controlled by armed groups, the election could not be conducted in many areas of the country. Some 800 of the country's polling stations, 14% of the total, were closed due to violence. Three Burundian peacekeepers were killed and an additional two were wounded during the run-up to the election. President Faustin-Archange Touadéra was reelected in the first round of the election in December 2020. Russian mercenaries from the Wagner Group have supported President Faustin-Archange Touadéra in the fight against rebels. Russia's Wagner group has been accused of harassing and intimidating civilians.   In December 2022 Roger Cohen wrote in the New York Times that "Wagner shock troops form a Praetorian Guard for Mr. Touadéra, who is also protected by Rwandan forces, in return for an untaxed license to exploit and export the Central African Republic's resources" and that "one Western ambassador called the Central African Republic’s status as a “vassal state” of the Kremlin."

Geography 

The Central African Republic is a landlocked nation within the interior of the African continent. It is bordered by Cameroon, Chad, Sudan, South Sudan, the Democratic Republic of the Congo, and the Republic of the Congo. The country lies between latitudes 2° and 11°N, and longitudes 14° and 28°E.

In addition to the Fertit Hills in the northeast of the Central African Republic, there are scattered hills in the southwest regions. The Central African Republic contains six terrestrial ecoregions: Northeastern Congolian lowland forests, Northwestern Congolian lowland forests, Western Congolian swamp forests, East Sudanian savanna, Northern Congolian forest-savanna mosaic, and Sahelian Acacia savanna.

At , the Central African Republic is the world's 44th-largest country.

Much of the southern border is formed by tributaries of the Congo River; the Mbomou River in the east merges with the Uele River to form the Ubangi River, which also comprises portions of the southern border. The Sangha River flows through some of the western regions of the country, while the eastern border lies along the edge of the Nile River watershed.

It has been estimated that up to 8% of the country is covered by forest, with the densest parts generally located in the southern regions. The forests are highly diverse and include commercially important species of Ayous, Sapelli and Sipo. The deforestation rate is about 0.4% per annum, and lumber poaching is commonplace. The Central African Republic had a 2018 Forest Landscape Integrity Index mean score of 9.28/10, ranking it seventh globally out of 172 countries.

In 2008, Central African Republic was the world's least light pollution affected country.

The Central African Republic is the focal point of the Bangui Magnetic Anomaly, one of the largest magnetic anomalies on Earth.

Wildlife 

In the southwest, the Dzanga-Sangha National Park is located in a rain forest area. The country is noted for its population of forest elephants and western lowland gorillas. In the north, the Manovo-Gounda St Floris National Park is well-populated with wildlife, including leopards, lions, cheetahs and rhinos, and the Bamingui-Bangoran National Park is located in the northeast of the Central African Republic. The parks have been seriously affected by the activities of poachers, particularly those from Sudan, over the past two decades.

Climate 

The climate of the Central African Republic is generally tropical, with a wet season that lasts from June to September in the northern regions of the country, and from May to October in the south. During the wet season, rainstorms are an almost daily occurrence, and early morning fog is commonplace.

The northern areas are hot and humid from February to May, but can be subject to the hot, dry, and dusty trade wind known as the Harmattan. The southern regions have a more equatorial climate, but they are subject to desertification, while the extreme northeast regions of the country are a steppe.

Prefectures and sub-prefectures 

The Central African Republic is divided into 16 administrative prefectures (préfectures), two of which are economic prefectures (préfectures economiques), and one an autonomous commune; the prefectures are further divided into 71 sub-prefectures (sous-préfectures).

The prefectures are Bamingui-Bangoran, Basse-Kotto, Haute-Kotto, Haut-Mbomou, Kémo, Lobaye, Mambéré-Kadéï, Mbomou, Nana-Mambéré, Ombella-M'Poko, Ouaka, Ouham, Ouham-Pendé and Vakaga. The economic prefectures are Nana-Grébizi and Sangha-Mbaéré, while the commune is the capital city of Bangui.

Politics and government

Politics in the Central African Republic formally take place in a framework of a presidential republic. In this system, the President is the head of state, with a Prime Minister as head of government. Executive power is exercised by the government. Legislative power is vested in both the government and parliament.

Changes in government have occurred in recent years by three methods: violence, negotiations, and elections. A new constitution was approved by voters in a referendum held on 5 December 2004. The government was rated 'Partly Free' from 1991 to 2001 and from 2004 to 2013.

Executive branch 
The president is elected by popular vote for a six-year term, and the prime minister is appointed by the president. The president also appoints and presides over the Council of Ministers, which initiates laws and oversees government operations. However, as of 2018 the official government is not in control of large parts of the country, which are governed by rebel groups.

Acting president since April 2016 is Faustin-Archange Touadéra who followed the interim government under Catherine Samba-Panza, interim prime minister André Nzapayeké.

Legislative branch 
The National Assembly (Assemblée Nationale) has 140 members, elected for a five-year term using the two-round (or Run-off) system.

Judicial branch
As in many other former French colonies, the Central African Republic's legal system is based on French law. The Supreme Court, or Cour Supreme, is made up of judges appointed by the president. There is also a Constitutional Court, and its judges are also appointed by the president.

Foreign relations
The Central African Republic relies heavily on Russian mercenaries for the protection of its diamond mines.

Foreign aid and UN Involvement 
The Central African Republic is heavily dependent upon foreign aid and numerous NGOs provide services that the government does not provide. In 2019, over US$100 million in foreign aid was spent in the country, mostly on humanitarian assistance.

In 2006, due to ongoing violence, over 50,000 people in the country's northwest were at risk of starvation, but this was averted due to assistance from the United Nations. On 8 January 2008, the UN Secretary-General Ban Ki-Moon declared that the Central African Republic was eligible to receive assistance from the Peacebuilding Fund. Three priority areas were identified: first, the reform of the security sector; second, the promotion of good governance and the rule of law; and third, the revitalization of communities affected by conflicts. On 12 June 2008, the Central African Republic requested assistance from the UN Peacebuilding Commission, which was set up in 2005 to help countries emerging from conflict avoid devolving back into war or chaos.

In response to concerns of a potential genocide, a peacekeeping force – the International Support Mission to the Central African Republic (MISCA) – was authorized in December 2013. This African Union force of 6,000 personnel was accompanied by the French Operation Sangaris.

In 2017, Central African Republic signed the UN treaty on the Prohibition of Nuclear Weapons.

Human rights 

The 2009 Human Rights Report by the United States Department of State noted that human rights in the Central African Republic were poor and expressed concerns over numerous government abuses. The U.S. State Department alleged that major human rights abuses such as extrajudicial executions by security forces, torture, beatings and rape of suspects and prisoners occurred with impunity. It also alleged harsh and life-threatening conditions in prisons and detention centers, arbitrary arrest, prolonged pretrial detention and denial of a fair trial, restrictions on freedom of movement, official corruption, and restrictions on workers' rights.

The State Department report also cites widespread mob violence, the prevalence of female genital mutilation, discrimination against women and Pygmies, human trafficking, forced labor, and child labor. Freedom of movement is limited in the northern part of the country "because of actions by state security forces, armed bandits, and other nonstate armed entities", and due to fighting between government and anti-government forces, many persons have been internally displaced.

Violence against children and women in relation to accusations of witchcraft has also been cited as a serious problem in the country. Witchcraft is a criminal offense under the penal code.

Freedom of speech is addressed in the country's constitution, but there have been incidents of government intimidation of the media. A report by the International Research & Exchanges Board's media sustainability index noted that "the country minimally met objectives, with segments of the legal system and government opposed to a free media system".

Approximately 68% of girls are married before they turn 18, and the United Nations' Human Development Index ranked the country 188 out of 188 countries surveyed. The Bureau of International Labor Affairs has also mentioned it in its last edition of the List of Goods Produced by Child Labor or Forced Labor.

Demographics

The population of the Central African Republic has almost quadrupled since independence.

The United Nations estimates that approximately 4% of the population aged between 15 and 49 is HIV positive. Only 3% of the country has antiretroviral therapy available, compared to a 17% coverage in the neighboring countries of Chad and the Republic of the Congo.

The nation is divided into over 80 ethnic groups, each having its own language. The largest ethnic groups are the Baggara Arabs, Baka, Banda, Bayaka, Fula, Gbaya, Kara, Kresh, Mbaka, Mandja, Ngbandi, Sara, Vidiri, Wodaabe, Yakoma, Yulu, Zande, with others including Europeans of mostly French descent.

Religion 

According to the 2003 national census, 80.3% of the population was Christian (51.4% Protestant and 28.9% Roman Catholic), 10% was Muslim and 4.5 percent other religious groups, with 5.5 percent having no religious beliefs. More recent work from the Pew Research Center estimated that, as of 2010, Christians constituted 89.8% of the population (60.7% Protestant and 28.5% Catholic) while Muslims made up 8.9%. The Catholic Church claims over 1.5 million adherents, approximately one-third of the population. Indigenous belief (animism) is also practiced, and many indigenous beliefs are incorporated into Christian and Islamic practice. A UN director described religious tensions between Muslims and Christians as being high.

There are many missionary groups operating in the country, including Lutherans, Baptists, Catholics, Grace Brethren, and Jehovah's Witnesses. While these missionaries are predominantly from the United States, France, Italy, and Spain, many are also from Nigeria, the Democratic Republic of the Congo, and other African countries. Large numbers of missionaries left the country when fighting broke out between rebel and government forces in 2002–3, but many of them have now returned to continue their work.

According to Overseas Development Institute research, during the crisis ongoing since 2012, religious leaders have mediated between communities and armed groups; they also provided refuge for people seeking shelter.

Languages 

The Central African Republic's two official languages are French and Sango (also spelled Sangho), a creole developed as an inter-ethnic lingua franca based on the local Ngbandi language. The Central African Republic is one of the few African countries to have granted official status to an African language.

Healthcare 

The largest hospitals in the country are located in the Bangui district. As a member of the World Health Organization, the Central African Republic receives vaccination assistance, such as a 2014 intervention for the prevention of a measles epidemic. In 2007, female life expectancy at birth was 48.2 years and male life expectancy at birth was 45.1 years.

Women's health is poor in the Central African Republic. , the country had the fourth highest maternal mortality rate in the world.
The total fertility rate in 2014 was estimated at 4.46 children born/woman. Approximately 25% of women had undergone female genital mutilation. Many births in the country are guided by traditional birth attendants, who often have little or no formal training.

Malaria is endemic in the Central African Republic, and one of the leading causes of death.
According to 2009 estimates, the HIV/AIDS prevalence rate is about 4.7% of the adult population (ages 15–49). This is in general agreement with the 2016 United Nations estimate of approximately 4%. Government expenditure on health was US$20 (PPP) per person in 2006 and 10.9% of total government expenditure in 2006. There was only around 1 physician for every 20,000 persons in 2009.

Education 

Public education in the Central African Republic is free and is compulsory from ages 6 to 14. However, approximately half of the adult population of the country is illiterate. The two institutions of higher education in the Central African Republic are the University of Bangui, a public university located in Bangui, which includes a medical school; and Euclid University, an international university.

Economy 

The per capita income of the Republic is often listed as being approximately $400 a year, one of the lowest in the world, but this figure is based mostly on reported sales of exports and largely ignores the unregistered sale of foods, locally produced alcoholic beverages, diamonds, ivory, bushmeat, and traditional medicine.

The currency of the Central African Republic is the CFA franc, which is accepted across the former countries of French West Africa and trades at a fixed rate to the euro. Diamonds constitute the country's most important export, accounting for 40–55% of export revenues, but it is estimated that between 30% and 50% of those produced each year leave the country clandestinely.
On 27 April 2022, Bitcoin (BTC) was adopted as an additional legal tender. Lawmakers unanimously adopted a bill that made bitcoin legal tender alongside the CFA franc and legalized the use of cryptocurrencies. President Faustin-Archange Touadéra signed the measure into law, said his chief of staff Obed Namsio.

Agriculture is dominated by the cultivation and sale of food crops such as cassava, peanuts, maize, sorghum, millet, sesame, and plantain. The annual real GDP growth rate is just above 3%. The importance of food crops over exported cash crops is indicated by the fact that the total production of cassava, the staple food of most Central Africans, ranges between 200,000 and 300,000 tonnes a year, while the production of cotton, the principal exported cash crop, ranges from 25,000 to 45,000 tonnes a year. Food crops are not exported in large quantities, but still constitute the principal cash crops of the country, because Central Africans derive far more income from the periodic sale of surplus food crops than from exported cash crops such as cotton or coffee. Much of the country is self-sufficient in food crops; however, livestock development is hindered by the presence of the tsetse fly.

The Republic's primary import partner is France (17.1%). Other imports come from the United States (12.3%), India (11.5%), and China (8.2%). Its largest export partner is France (31.2%), followed by Burundi (16.2%), China (12.5%), Cameroon (9.6%), and Austria (7.8%).

The Central African Republic is a member of the Organization for the Harmonization of Business Law in Africa (OHADA). In the 2009 World Bank Group's report Doing Business, it was ranked 183rd of 183 as regards 'ease of doing business', a composite index which takes into account regulations that enhance business activity and those that restrict it.

Infrastructure

Transportation 

Bangui is the transport hub of the Central African Republic. As of 1999, eight roads connected the city to other main towns in the country, Cameroon, Chad and South Sudan; of these, only the toll roads are paved. During the rainy season from July to October, some roads are impassable.

River ferries sail from the river port at Bangui to Brazzaville and Zongo. The river can be navigated most of the year between Bangui and Brazzaville. From Brazzaville, goods are transported by rail to Pointe-Noire, Congo's Atlantic port.

Bangui M'Poko International Airport is Central African Republic's only international airport. As of June 2014 it had regularly scheduled direct flights to Brazzaville, Casablanca, Cotonou, Douala, Kinshasa, Lomé, Luanda, Malabo, N'Djamena, Paris, Pointe-Noire, and Yaoundé.

Since at least 2002 there have been plans to connect Bangui by rail to the Transcameroon Railway.

Energy 
The Central African Republic primarily uses hydroelectricity as there are few other low cost resources for generating electricity.

Communications 

Presently, the Central African Republic has active television services, radio stations, internet service providers, and mobile phone carriers; Socatel is the leading provider for both internet and mobile phone access throughout the country. The primary governmental regulating bodies of telecommunications are the Ministère des Postes and Télécommunications et des Nouvelles Technologies. In addition, the Central African Republic receives international support on telecommunication related operations from ITU Telecommunication Development Sector (ITU-D) within the International Telecommunication Union to improve infrastructure.

Culture

Sports 

Football is the country's most popular sport. The national football team is governed by the Central African Football Federation and stages matches at the Barthélemy Boganda Stadium.

Basketball also is popular  and its national team won the African Championship twice and was the first Sub-Saharan African team to qualify for the Basketball World Cup, in 1974.

See also

 Outline of the Central African Republic
 Central African Republic–Chad border, 
 Sudan to the northeast, South Sudan to the southeast, the DR Congo to the south, the Republic of the Congo to the southwest, and Cameroon to the west.
 List of Central African Republic–related topics

References

Citations

Bibliography 
 
 
 
 Balogh, Besenyo, Miletics, Vogel: La République Centrafricaine

Further reading 

 Doeden, Matt, Central African Republic in Pictures (Twentyfirst Century Books, 2009).
 Petringa, Maria, Brazza, A Life for Africa (2006). .
 Titley, Brian, Dark Age: The Political Odyssey of Emperor Bokassa, 2002.
 Woodfrok, Jacqueline, Culture and Customs of the Central African Republic  (Greenwood Press, 2006).

External links

Overviews
 Country Profile from BBC News
 Central African Republic. The World Factbook. Central Intelligence Agency.
 Central African Republic from UCB Libraries GovPubs
 
 
 Key Development Forecasts for the Central African Republic from International Futures

News
 Central African Republic news headline links from AllAfrica.com

Other
 Central African Republic at Humanitarian and Development Partnership Team (HDPT)
 Johann Hari in Birao, Central African Republic. "Inside France's Secret War" from The Independent, 5 October 2007

 
French-speaking countries and territories
Landlocked countries
Least developed countries
Member states of the Organisation internationale de la Francophonie
Member states of the African Union
Member states of the United Nations
Republics
States and territories established in 1960
Central African countries
1960 establishments in the Central African Republic
Countries in Africa
Observer states of the Organisation of Islamic Cooperation